Copeland Bryan (born July 14, 1983) is a former American football defensive end. Bryan signed with the Tennessee Titans as an undrafted free agent in 2006, and played in games for the NFL's Buffalo Bills and Detroit Lions. He ended his playing career with the Las Vegas Locomotives and Montreal Alouettes.

Bryan played college football at the University of Arizona. He is the older brother of NFL safety Courtney Bryan, and cousin of NFL players Donny Brady and Gary Brown.

Early life 
Copeland Jameel Bryan was born July 14, 1983 in San Jose, California, the son of Copeland Bryan and Viera Whye.  Bryan attended Bellarmine College Preparatory School where he lettered in football and track.

College 
Bryan attended the University of Arizona where he walked-on the football team in 2001. After redshirting his freshman year, he placed second in sacks and in tackles for loss in 2002 and was given a scholarship. Bryan eventually played in 43 games with 22 starts from 2002 to 2005. He finished his college career with 109 tackles, 14 sacks, 21 TFLs, 11 PBUs, blocked 1 kick, forced 2 fumbles and had 2 fumble recoveries.  Bryan earned Second-team All-Pac-10 honor in 2005.

Professional career 
Bryan entered the NFL as an undrafted free agent and signed with the Tennessee Titans on May 4, 2006.  He was waived by the Titans in September 2006 and was signed immediately by the Chicago Bears practice squad. Bryan did not enter any games for the Chicago Bears which played in Super Bowl XLI. Bryan was waived by the Bears the following preseason. He signed with the Buffalo Bills in September 2007 and made his NFL debut against the New York Jets on October 28, 2007. He played 2 games for them in 2007 and 15 games in 2008.  He then signed a three year contract with the Detroit Lions, playing 5 games in 2009 before being placed on injured reserve with a sprained knee. Bryan later played for the Las Vegas Locomotives in 2011 and signed a two-year contract to play for the Montreal Alouettes in 2012.

References

External links
 Player Stats for Copeland Bryan at NFL.com
Montreal Alouettes bio

Players of American football from San Jose, California
Players of Canadian football from San Jose, California
American football defensive ends
Arizona Wildcats football players
Tennessee Titans players
Chicago Bears players
Buffalo Bills players
Montreal Alouettes players
1983 births
Living people
Las Vegas Locomotives players